Chorobek Baigazakov (5 December 1946 – 3 February 2022) was a Soviet and Kyrgyz politician. He served in the Supreme Council from 1990 to 1995, which was called the Supreme Soviet of the Kirghiz Soviet Socialist Republic until 31 August 1991. He died on 3 February 2022, at the age of 75.

References

1946 births
2022 deaths
Kyrgyz National University alumni
Members of the Supreme Council (Kyrgyzstan)
People from Naryn Region
Soviet politicians